Bogolyubovka is a rural locality (a village) in Arovsky Selsoviet, Chishminsky District, Bashkortostan, Russia. The population was 36 as of 2010. There are 11 streets.

Geography 
Bogolyubovka is located 28 km southeast of Chishmy (the district's administrative centre) by road. Klyashevo is the nearest rural locality.

References 

Rural localities in Chishminsky District